Jules Bel (30 September 1842 – 11 January 1904) was a French cheese maker. He was the founder of Groupe Bel.

Early life
Jules Bel was born on 30 September 1842 in Chambéria, in rural France.

Career
In 1865, Bel started his cheese company.

Personal life
He married Adèle Odile Colombet.

Death
He died on 11 January 1904 in Orgelet, France.

References

1842 births
1904 deaths
People from Franche-Comté
Cheesemakers
French company founders